The French ship Sophie was a slave vessel launched at Nantes in May 1790. Her owners commissioned her there as a privateer in 1793 after the outbreak of the French Revolutionary Wars. The French Navy, desperate for escort vessels, requisitioned her on 21 April 1794. In May 1795, the French Navy returned the ship to her owners for use as a privateer.  captured her off the Irish Coast in September 1798. The Royal Navy took Sophie into service. She then served in the North Sea, Baltic, Mediterranean, and East Indies until she was broken up in 1809.

Capture
When Endymion captured Sophie in September 1798, Sophie had been out 82 days, but had taken nothing. She was armed with 22 guns and had a crew of 130 men. Captain Thomas Williams, of Endymion, described Sophie as: ... a very fine Ship, quite new, and well adapted for His Majesty's Service, being an extraordinary fast Sailer; she having been chased Eight different Times during her last Cruize by our Ships of War, and each time escaped by superior Sailing.

HMS Sophie
Endymion brought Sophie and two merchant prizes into Spithead on 5 September 1798. She arrived at Portsmouth on 12 September 1798, but was not fitted there until July–September 1799. The Royal Navy took her into service as HMS Sophie, registering and establishing her on 5 October 1798.

Commander George Burdett commissioned Sophie in September 1799. On 3 December, she returned to Portsmouth from a cruise to Bilbao. On 9 May 1800, she convoyed transports from Portsmouth to Guernsey. O 22 July Sophie arrived at Portsmouth with the navy transports Sea Nymph, Howard, Huddleton, and Diligence, which she had convoyed from Ireland.

In 1801, she was on the Newfoundland station.

In April 1802, Commander Philip Lewis Rosenhagen took command for the Downs station, and then the North Sea. He recommissioned her in April 1803. However, the proceeds were only £38 17s and were to be shared with over 800 men. The prize agents therefore bought 1 lottery tickets. Unfortunately, there is no announcement of the proceeds of the lottery tickets.

In July 1802, Sophie was sailing to and from Jersey. At the end of the month she and several other naval vessels sailed there to convoy transports that were taking Dutch troops from Jersey to Cuxhaven. she returned to Portsmouth from Cuxhaven on 2 September.

Between 8 August and 14 September 1803, and perhaps longer, Sophie maintained a blockade on the Weser river.

Sophie then shared with the same three vessels in the proceeds of the capture on 11 August of the Vyf Gebroeders, Lintz, master; Vier Gesusters, Hacrna, master; Jonge Jan, Dick, master; Jonge Rocloss, Groot, master; and Vrow Sevantye, Janiz, master. On 27 August  detained the Hendrick and Jan.

In 1804, Sophie transferred to the Gibraltar station and the Mediterranean. By February, she was convoying trtansports between Gibraltar and Lisbon.

On 17 January 1805, Sophie captured the Greek ship San Nicholai. She shared the prize money with Fisgard and Beaver, Beaver sharing by agreement with Sophie.

On 6 May, Sophie captured Dolphin. Then on 5 July  Sophie captured the Spanish zebeque Francisco de Assis (or St Francis d'Assis).  was in company.

In March 1806, Commander William Mansell replaced Rosenhagen. Sophie sailed to the East Indies in 1808.

Fate
The "Principal Officers and Commissioners of His Majesty's Navy" offered the sloops "Sophie, Echo, and Cerf, lying at Deptford" for sale on 12 January 1809. Sophie docked at Deptford on 29 June 1809 to be broken up.

Notes

Citations

References
  
 

Corvettes of the French Navy
Sloops of the Royal Navy
Captured ships
Privateer ships of France